Lake Rotoiti is the name of two lakes in New Zealand:

Lake Rotoiti (Bay of Plenty), in the North Island
Lake Rotoiti (Tasman), in the South Island